{{DISPLAYTITLE:C4H4N2OS}}
The molecular formula C4H4N2OS (molar mass: 128.15 g/mol, exact mass: 128.0044 u) may refer to:

 2-Thiouracil
 4-Thiouracil

Molecular formulas